Samuel Hans Adler (born March 4, 1928) is an American composer, conductor, author, and professor. During the course of a professional career which ranges over six decades he has served as a faculty member at both the University of Rochester's Eastman School of Music and the Juilliard School. In addition, he is credited with founding and conducting the Seventh Army Symphony Orchestra which participated in the cultural diplomacy initiatives of the United States in Germany and throughout Europe in the aftermath of World War II. Adler's musical catalogue includes over 400 published compositions. He has been honored with several awards including Germany's Order of Merit – Officer's Cross.

Biography
Adler was born to a Jewish family in Mannheim, Germany, the son of Hugo Chaim Adler, a cantor and composer, and Selma Adler who was an amateur pianist. The family fled to the United States in 1939, where Hugo became the cantor of Temple Emanuel in Worcester, Massachusetts. Sam soon followed his father into the music profession and began his musical studies on the violin with Albert Levy. His formal education in composition was initiated under Herbert Fromm in 1941. Subsequently, Adler earned degrees from both Boston University (where he studied musicology with Karl Geiringer) and Harvard University (where he studied with Aaron Copland, Irving Fine, Paul Hindemith, Paul Pisk, Walter Piston, and Randall Thompson and earned an M.A. in 1950). He studied conducting with Serge Koussevitzky at the Berkshire Music Center at Tanglewood in 1949. Adler has been awarded honorary doctorates from Southern Methodist and Wake Forest Universities, St. Mary's College of Notre Dame and the St. Louis Conservatory of Music.

After completing his academic studies in 1950, Adler served as a corporal in the 2d Armored Division. During this time he founded the Seventh Army Symphony Orchestra (1952) in Stuttgart, Germany which served to demonstrate the shared cultural heritage of America and Europe in the post World War II era through cultural diplomacy. For this, he received a special Citation of Excellence from the Army for the orchestra's success between 1952 and 1961. Subsequently, he accepted a position as music director at Temple Emanu-El in Dallas, Texas, beginning his tenure there in 1953. At the Dallas temple he formed a children's choir and an adult choir. From 1954 to 1958 Adler conducted the Dallas Lyric Theater. From 1957 to 1966, Adler served as Professor of Composition at the University of North Texas College of Music. Between 1966 and 1995, Adler served as Professor of Composition at the University of Rochester's Eastman School of Music. In addition, he served as Chairman of the Department of Music at The Eastman School of Music from 1973 to 1994. Since 1997, Adler has been a member of the composition faculty at Juilliard and, for the 2009–10 year, was awarded the William Schuman Scholars Chair.

He is also the author of three books, Choral Conducting (Holt Rinehart and Winston 1971, second edition Schirmer Books 1985), Sight Singing (W.W. Norton 1979, 1997), and The Study of Orchestration (W.W. Norton 1982, 1989, 2001, 2016; Italian edition edited by Lorenzo Ferrero for EDT Srl Torino, 2008). He has also contributed numerous articles to major magazines, books and encyclopedias published in the U.S. and abroad. Adler also reflected upon six decades of teaching in his memoirs Building Bridges with Music: Stories from a Composer's Life which was published by Pendragon Press in 2017.

Over the decades Adler's musical legacy has been interpreted by several orchestral ensembles including: the Cleveland Chamber Symphony, Esterhazy Quartet, the Latvian National Symphony Orchestra, Brandenburgisches Staatsorchester Frankfurt and the Bowling Green Philharmonia. In more recent times his works have also been showcased by leading orchestras around the world including: the Berlin Radio Symphony Orchestra, the Los Angeles Philharmonic, the Mannheim National Theatre Orchestra, and the St. Louis Symphony. Performances of his compositions have been recorded on several record labels including: Albany Records, Linn Records, Navona Records, and Naxos Records.

Adler is married to Emily Freeman Brown who is currently serving as Music Director and Conductor of the Bowling Green Philharmonia.

Compositional style

Musicologists have noted that Adler's works incorporate a wide range of compositional techniques including: free atonality, diatonicism, and serialism. In addition, he is recognized for interweaving dance rhythms, folk themes, ostinati and devices associated with aleatoric music throughout his scores. Adler does not advocate serialism or atonality.

It has also been observed that Adler's compositions illustrate a "midstream modernism" which is characterized by interwoven contrapunctal musical lines which form the foundation for a tonal harmonic complex punctuated by tangential atonal episodes. In addition, his music is said to be inspired by the liturgical cantilena featured in the Jewish musical tradition as well as oriental inflections.

Awards
Adler has been awarded many prizes, including a membership into the American Academy in Berlin (2004) and Institute of Arts and Letters awarded in May 2001, the Charles Ives Award and the Lillian Fairchild Award. In May, 2003, he was presented with the Aaron Copland Award by ASCAP for Lifetime Achievement in Music (Composition and Teaching). In 2008 he was inducted into the American Classical Music Hall of Fame. In 1999, he was elected to the Academy of Arts, Berlin for distinguished service to music. In 1983, he won the Deems Taylor Award for his book on orchestration; in 1984, he was appointed Honorary Professorial Fellow of the University College in Cardiff, Wales, and was awarded a Guggenheim Fellowship for 1984–85. He has been a MacDowell Fellow for five years between 1954 and 1963. In 1986 he received the "Distinguished Alumni Award" from Boston University.

The Music Teachers' National Association selected Adler as its "Composer of the Year 1986–87" for Quintalogues, which won the national competition. In the 1988–89 year, he has been designated "Phi Beta Kappa Visiting Scholar." In 1989, he was awarded The Eastman School's Eisenhart Award for distinguished teaching, and he has been given the honor of Composer of the Year (1991) for the American Guild of Organists. During his second visit to Chile, Adler was elected to the Chilean Academy of Fine Arts (1993) "for his outstanding contributions to the world of music as composer, conductor, and author." He was initiated as an honorary member of the Gamma Theta (1960, University of North Texas) and the Alpha Alpha (1966, National Honorary) chapters of Phi Mu Alpha Sinfonia, and in 1986 was named a National Arts Associate to Sigma Alpha Iota, international music fraternity for women. In 1998, he was awarded the Brock Commission from the American Choral Directors Association.

In May, 2018, Adler was awarded the German Bundesverdienstkreuz 1. Klasse (Order of Merit – Officer's Cross), presented to him in New York by Consul General David Gill. On June 1, 2018, Adler was awarded an honorary Doctor of Humane Letters and presented the graduation address at Hebrew Union College - Jewish Institute of Religion's Cincinnati graduation ceremony.

Works
Adler's catalogue includes over 400 published works in all media, including three operas, six symphonies, ten string quartets, at least eleven concerti (organ, piano, violin, viola or clarinet, cello, flute, guitar, saxophone quartet, woodwind quintet), many shorter orchestral works, works for wind ensemble and band, chamber music, a great deal of choral music, liturgical music, and songs.

Solo instrumental

Four Composer Portraits (Birthday Cards for Solo Piano), for unaccompanied piano
Bassoonery (Study for Bassoon Solo), for unaccompanied bassoon (1965)
A Bonnie Tune (A Scherzo for Solo Flute), for unaccompanied flute (2012)
Bravura (A Concert Piece for Bass Trombone), for unaccompanied bass trombone (2012)
Bridges to Span Adversity, for harpsichord (1991)
Cantilena, for solo F horn (2018)
Canto III, for solo violin
Canto V
Canto VII Unaccompanied tuba solo // ungraded (1976)
Canto VIII, for solo piano (1976)
Canto IX, for Multiple Percussion Solo (1979), co-composed with John H. Beck calling for 5 timpani and 6 rototoms
Clarinon, for unaccompanied B-flat clarinet
Fantasy, for solo piano (2014)
Festschrift, for solo piano
Flaunting, for unaccompanied flute
From Generation to Generation, for solo organ
In Memory of Milton, for solo violin (2012)
In Praise of Bach, for solo organ (2003)
Meadowmountetudes (Four Studies Of 20th-Century Techniques), for solo violin (1996)
Oboration, for unaccompanied oboe (1965)
The Sense of Touch (Eight Short Pieces Introducing the Young Pianist to Techniques Used in Twentieth-Century Music), for solo piano (1983)
Solemn Soliloquy, for solo violin (2015)
Sonata, for solo guitar (1990)
Sonata, for harpsichord (1984)
Three Piano Preludes, for solo piano
Thy Song Expands My Spirit (A Tribute to Aaron Copland on His 80th Birthday), for solo piano (1983)
Two Meditations, for organ (1965)

Chamber ensemble

Acrostics (Four Games for Six Players)
Be Not Afraid: The Isle Is Full Of Noises, for brass quintet
Brahmsiana
Caccia, for two flutes
Concert Piece
Contrasting Inventions
Diary of a Journey
Divertimento
Divertissement, for viola and marimba
Divertissement, for violin and marimba
Festival Fanfare and Dance, for brass ensemble
Fidl-Fantazye: A Klezmer Concerto, for violin and piano (2017)
Five Movements
Five Vignettes, for 12 trombones (1968)
Four Dialogues for Euphonium, for euphonium and marimba
Into the Radiant Boundaries, for viola and guitar
Introit & Toccatina
L'Olam Vaed, for cello and piano
Let the Trumpet Sound, for trumpet and organ (2015)
Life Is an Ecstasy, for trumpet and organ (2017)
Pasiphae, for piano and percussion
Pensive Soliloquy, for E-flat alto saxophone and piano (1998)
Ports Of Call, for violin duet
Praeludium
Primavera Amarilla
Quintet, for piano and string quartet
Recitative and Rondo Capriccioso, for flute and piano (2014)
Romp, for string quartet
Scherzo Schmerzo, for trumpet, horn, trombone, tuba, and percussion
Sonata, for horn and piano (1948)
Sonata, for flute and piano (2006)
Sonata, for viola and piano (1987)
String Quartet No. 6 (A Whitman Serenade for medium voice and string quartet)
String Quartet No. 9 (2010)
String Quartet No. 10 (2015)
Three Pieces, for cello and piano (2016)
Time in Tempest Everywhere
Trio ("5 Snapshots"), for string trio
Trumpetry
Two Southern Appalachian Folk Songs, for violin and piano (2014)

Vocal/choral

Five Choral Scherzi, for mixed chorus, viola, and guitar
In Praise Of Labor, for voice and piano
Jonah (The Man Without Tolerance), for SATB chorus and orchestra
Nuptial Scene (1975)
Of Love and Dreams, for voice and piano (2018)
Of Saints & Sinners-Mez
Passionate Sword-Fl/Cl
A Psalm Trilogy, for a cappella SATB chorus (1997)
Recalling The Yesterdays, for mezzo-soprano, flute, clarinet, violin, cello, piano, and percussion
Serenade
Sixth String Quartet
Song Of Songs Fragments, for mezzo-soprano, clarinet, and piano
Those Were The Days, for voice and piano
Two Shelley Songs, for SATB chorus and piano (1982)
To Remember: To Be Remembered
Todesfuge, for tenor voice and piano
We Believe A Hymn Of Faith
Five Sephardic Choruses (1991)
The Binding, An Oratorio in Three Parts, for soli, chorus and orhestra

Orchestra

All Nature Plays
American Airs and Dances
Art Creates Artists
A Bridge to Understanding
Centennial
Drifting on Wind and Currents
Elegy, for string orchestra
In Just Spring
In The Spirit Of Bach, for string orchestra (2015)
Jonah (The Man Without Tolerance), for SATB chorus and orchestra
Man Lebt Nur Einmal (Darum Tanzen Wir), for large orchestra
Serenade
Seven Variations on 'God Save the King, for small or chamber orchestra
Shadow Dances
Show An Affirming Flame
Symphony No. 1 (1953)
Symphony No. 2 (1957)
Symphony No. 3 ("Diptych", 1960, rev. 1980)
Symphony No. 4 ("Geometrics", 1965)
Symphony No. 5 ("We Are the Echoes"), for mezzo-soprano and orchestra (1975)
Symphony No. 6 (1985)
Time in Tempest Everywhere, for soprano, oboe, and chamber orchestra
We Believe: A Hymn of Faith

Orchestra with soloist(s)

Arcos Concerto (A Bridge between the Old and the New), for flute, oboe, clarinet, bassoon and string orchestra
Beyond the Pale (A Portrait of a Klezmer), for clarinet and string orchestra
Concerto, for cello and orchestra (1999)
Concerto, for viola and orchestra (2002)
Concerto, for violin and orchestra (2015)
Concerto "Shir Ha Ma'alot", for woodwind quintet and orchestra
Concerto for Guitar and Orchestra (1998)
Concerto for Horn and Orchestra
Concerto for Organ and Orchestra
 Concerto for Piano and Orchestra (1983) 
Concerto No. 2, for piano and orchestra (1997)
Fidl-Fantazye: A Klezmer Concerto, for violin and orchestra
Lux Perpetua, for organ and orchestra
 Piano Concerto No. 3, for piano and string orchestra
Those Were the Days

Band/wind ensemble

American Airs and Dances
Concerto for Guitar and Wind Ensemble
Concerto for Winds, Brass and Percussion
Dawn to Glory
A Little Night and Day Music (1977)
Pygmalion
The River That Mines the Silences of Stones (2016)
Rogues and Lovers
Serenata Concertante, for flute, oboe, clarinet, bassoon, alto saxophone and wind ensemble
Solemn March

Stage works

The Outcast of Poker Flat, 1959, opera, staged Dallas, April 1961
The Wrestler, 1971, opera, staged Dallas, June 1972
The Disappointment, 1974, opera [reconstruction of an early ballad opera]
The Lodge of Shadows, musical drama for baritone solo, dancers and orchestra
The Waking, 1978, ballet

Liturgical music 

B'shaaray Tefilah: A Sabbath Service (1963), for Cantor, SATB and Organ
Call to Worship (1995), for cantor, SATB and organ
Hashkiveinu (1981), for cantor, SATB, and organ
L'cha Dodi (1984), for solo, SATB, organ and flute
Ma Tovu (2011), for tenor, SATB and organ
Psalm 24 (2003), for SATB and organ
Psalm 40, for SATB and organ
Psalm 67, for SATB and organ
Psalm 96, for SATB and organ
Psalm 146 (1985), for SATB and organ
Shir Chadash – A Friday Eve Service, for organ and 3 part choir (SAB)
The Twenty-Third Psalm – Hebrew and English (1981), for tenor, SATB and organ
Yamim Naraim I and II – A Two-Volume Anthology for the High Holy Days (1990–91), for cantor, SATB and organ

Notable students

Since 1997 he has been a member of the composition faculty at the Juilliard School in New York City. Among his most successful students are composers Fisher Tull, Kamran Ince, Eric Ewazen, Claude Baker, Marc Mellits, Robert Paterson, Gordon Stout, Chris Theofanidis, Michael Brown, Michael Glenn Williams, Gordon Chin and Roger Briggs.

References
Notes

Sources
 Darryl Lyman: Great Jews in Music. J. D. Publishers, Middle Village, N.Y, 1986.
 David M. Cummings, Dennis K. McIntire (Ed.): International Who's Who in Music and Musician's Directory. In the Classical and Light Classical Fields, twelfth edition 1990/91. International Who's Who in Music, Cambridge, England 1991.
 Kurtz Myers: Index to Record Reviews 1984–1987. G.K. Hall, Boston, Ma. 1989.
 Gerry Cristol: A Light in the Prairie: Temple Emanu-El of Dallas 1872–1997. TCU Press, Fort Worth TX 1998, .
Marie Rolf: "Adler, Samuel". In: The New Grove Dictionary of Music and Musicians, second edition. Edited by S. Sadie and J. Tyrrell. Macmillan Publishers, London 2001.
 Don Michael Randel (Ed.): "Adler, Samuel". In The Harvard Biographical Dictionary of Music, The Belknap Press of Harvard University Press, Cambridge, MA, 1996.
 R. Winston Morris, Lloyd E. Bone Jr., Eric Paull  (Ed.): "Adler, Samuel". In Guide to the Euphonium Repertoire – The Euphoneum Sourcebook. Indiana University Press, IN 2007

Further reading

External links

Interview with Samuel Adler, January 21, 1991
Samuel Hans Adler Papers at the Eastman School of Music, University of Rochester

1928 births
Living people
20th-century American composers
20th-century classical composers
20th-century American conductors (music)
21st-century American conductors (music)
20th-century American male musicians
21st-century American male musicians
20th-century American military personnel
American classical composers
American male classical composers
American male conductors (music)
American opera composers
American people of Belgian-Jewish descent
Boston University College of Fine Arts alumni
Brandeis University faculty
Composers for the classical guitar
Eastman School of Music faculty
German male classical composers
German opera composers
German people of Belgian descent
Harvard Graduate School of Arts and Sciences alumni
Jewish American classical composers
Jewish American military personnel
Jewish emigrants from Nazi Germany to the United States
Juilliard School faculty
Male opera composers
Members of the American Academy of Arts and Letters
Officers Crosses of the Order of Merit of the Federal Republic of Germany
Organization founders
Musicians from Mannheim
Pupils of Aaron Copland
Pupils of Paul Hindemith
Pupils of Paul Pisk
Pupils of Randall Thompson
Pupils of Serge Koussevitzky
Pupils of Walter Piston
Texas classical music
United States Army non-commissioned officers
University of North Texas College of Music faculty